Sylvie-Agnès Bermann (born 19 October 1953) is a French former career diplomat who served as the ambassador of France to the United Kingdom, ambassador of France to Russia, and as French ambassador to China in Beijing from 2011 until 2014. She previously served as director for United Nations, International Organizations, Human Rights and Francophony at the French Ministry of Foreign Affairs and International Development in Paris.

Early life and education 
Bermann is a graduate of Paris-Sorbonne University where she studied history, the Paris Institute of Political Studies ("Sciences Po"), the French Institut national des langues et civilisations orientales where she studied Chinese, and the Beijing Language and Culture University

Career 
Bermann embarked on her diplomatic career in 1979. She served as vice-consul at the French Consulate General in Hong Kong from 1979 to 1980, and subsequently became third secretary, then second secretary, at the French embassy in China between 1980 and 1982.Bermann was subsequently responsible for policy relating to China/Hong Kong/Taiwan at the French Ministry of Foreign Affairs and International Development until 1986, when she became second counsellor at the French embassy in Moscow. In 1989, Bermann returned to Paris to take up the post of head of the Southeast Asia Department, where she remained until 1992.

In 1992 Bermann was appointed second counsellor at the Permanent Mission of France to the United Nations in New York. In 1996, she became head of the Common Foreign and Security Policy Department at the French Foreign Ministry, before becoming ambassador as permanent representative of France to the Western European Union and to the European Union's Political and Security Committee (PSC) in Brussels in 2002.
 
Bermann headed the French Foreign Ministry's directorate for the UN and international organizations, human rights and Francophony, from December 2005 to February 2011.

Bermann was appointed ambassador extraordinary and plenipotentiary to China on 23 February 2011, becoming the first woman to hold the post of French ambassador in a country which is a permanent member of the Security Council. She became French ambassador to the United Kingdom in August 2014.

Other activities
 Institute of Advanced Studies in National Defence (IHEDN), Member of the Board of Directors (since 2020)
In 2021 Bermann published a book about Britain and Brexit - Goodbye Britannia based on stereotypes of French hatred toward Britain  (Éditions Stock). She had previously written a book on China - La Chine en eaux profondes (Éditions Stock, 2017).

Honours 
  Officier, Légion d'honneur (2012)
  Commander (2019) of the Ordre national du Mérite, Officier in 2008.

See also 
 List of Ambassadors of France to the United Kingdom
 Ministère des Affaires étrangères de la France

References

External links 

 www.legifrance.gouv.fr
 www.francobritishcouncil.org.uk
 Ambassador Bermann At Home with the FT interview
 Ambassador Bermann Saturday Interview with The Times
 Ambassador Bermann Evening Standard interview 2016
 Ambassador Bermann Evening Standard interview 2014

1953 births
Living people
French people of Austrian descent
Paris-Sorbonne University alumni
Sciences Po alumni
Politicians from Paris
Ambassadors of France to the United Kingdom
Officiers of the Légion d'honneur
Commanders of the Ordre national du Mérite
Ambassadors of France to China
French sinologists
French women ambassadors
Women orientalists
Ambassadors of France to Russia
People from Jura (department)